Rumohra is a genus of ferns in the family Dryopteridaceae, subfamily Elaphoglossoideae, in the Pteridophyte Phylogeny Group classification of 2016 (PPG I).

The fronds of species within this genus contain round sori (reproductive clusters) on the underside of the pinnae (leaflets) unlike many other ferns which have separate specialized reproductive fronds. Many of the sori have peltate indusia and have prominent scales on the stipes of the fronds. Species have a wide distribution; for example, Rumohra adiantiformis is found in the Old World as well as the New World, including such diverse places as the Galapagos Islands and New Zealand.

Species
, the Checklist of Ferns and Lycophytes of the World accepted the following species:
Rumohra adiantiformis (G.Forst.) Ching
Rumohra berteroana (Colla) R.R.Rodriguez
Rumohra glandulosa Tardieu
Rumohra glandulosissima Sundue & J.Prado
Rumohra humbertii Tardieu
Rumohra linearisquamata Rakotondr.
Rumohra lokohensis Tardieu
Rumohra madagascarica (Bonap.) Tardieu
Rumohra quadrangularis (Fée) Brade

References

Dryopteridaceae
Fern genera